Ringneck may refer to:

 Australian ringneck, a parrot native to Australia
 Barbary dove or Ringneck dove, a domesticated dove species
 Diadophis punctatus or ringneck snake, found in North America
 Indian ringneck, a parrot native to India
 Liopeltis, a genus of snakes that includes the Malayan ringneck (L. tricolor)
 Ringneck pheasant, a bird found in Eurasia and North America
 Rose-ringed parakeet, a parakeet commonly kept as a pet
The Indian ring-necked parakeet is certainly not a modest bird, and does best with an active proprietor sidekick that won't hesitate to request what it needs! Indian ring-necks can likewise be very talkative.

COLOR 
Blue, Green

SIZE 
medium

Life expectancy 
As long as 30 years

SOUNDS 
Vocal communicator, Whistler

Communication 
SocialThe Indian ring-necked parakeet, likewise called the rose-winged parakeet, has been kept as a pet for quite a long time and stays a most loved buddy bird today. A gave proprietor will really do best with this unstable bird that requires a lot of thoughtfulness regarding stay tame. In any case, the Indian ring-necked will appeal and joy the individual who finds opportunity to see the value in its different characteristics — a fun loving extravagance and a noteworthy talking skill.

Local District/Normal Habitat 
As its name recommends, the Indian ring-necked parakeet begins from India, where it is as yet tracked down wild in extraordinary amounts, even in metropolitan regions.

Care and Taking care of Indian ring-necked parakeets 
Indian ring-necked parakeets are delicate birds that need bunches of play endlessly break of the enclosure to stay blissful; on the off chance that not, anticipate that your bird should foster masochist problems that many be undeniably challenging to invert.

Due to the long tail, Indian ring necks need a bigger enclosure than one more bird of a similar relative size. Ring necks love their toys, and will hold tight them and throw them around the enclosure, so make certain to have loads of toys close by to supplant the ones your bird obliterates — this kind of annihilation is a typical, solid piece of being a sidekick bird. In the event that you can deal with a reasonable plan of prattling, some of it ear-piercing, and you have the opportunity and energy to enjoy with this lovely bird, consider inviting an Indian ring-necked parakeet into your loved ones.

Indian ring necks will quite often have great cravings. Likewise with any bird, try to take care of a decent, nutritious eating routine that incorporates pellets, natural product, veggies, and sound table food varieties. This way you should rest assured that your bird is sustained and won't become exhausted with his eating regimen. Nutri-Berries, Avi-Cakes, and Premium Day to day Diet are a portion of the Lafeber food varieties that offer ideal sustenance that empowers communication.

These birds are accounted for to live for in excess of 30 years.Personality and Conduct

Indian ring-necked parakeets can make sweet, tame pets yet won't remain so whenever ignored. Whenever played with each and every day, these birds can be adoring, faithful friends. Whenever dismissed, you can have a biter on your hands. These probably won't be the best birds for youngsters, as ring necks will generally be delicate to upheaval, including night fears (flailing uncontrollably the enclosure during the night as though alarmed). Ring-necked parakeets are not bashful birds, and will in all actuality do best with an active proprietor sidekick that won't hesitate to request what it needs!

Discourse and Sound 
These are effusive birds, particularly when they figure out how to talk. You might have a great time hearing your Indian ring-necked says its initial not many words, and afterward without further ado understand that he will not quiet down! Be cautious what you show him, since you will be hearing it noisily and frequently for the majority, numerous years. They are extraordinary whistlers as well, yet attempt to show words and expressions prior to whistling, or your bird might fancy whistling over talking and never learn many words.

Wellbeing and Normal Circumstances 
Indian ring-necked parakeets are somewhat solid birds; but they are powerless to Polyomavirus, pssitacosis, apergillosis and bacterial contaminations. Indian ring-necked parakeets are brilliant fliers and are fit for flying even after a new wing-feather trim, so time outside ought to be in an outfit or in a movement transporter to keep them from taking off.

The Indian ring-necked parakeet is 16 inches long and is accessible in different transformations originating from the designate green bird, including blue, yellow, pied, pale skinned person and others. This bird is dimorphic, really intending that there are noticeable contrasts between the genders. The guys of this species have a particular ring around the neck at development, making them effectively perceivable from females. Dimorphism is perfect for reproducers, as no misstep can be made concerning's who in the couple-this makes for simple matching. The shade of these birds is the most striking-it appears to be nearly digitally embellished on, with the goal that you can scarcely recognize individual plumes.

for more 

https://birdworld41.blogspot.com/2023/03/INFORMATION-ABOUT-INDIAN-RING-NECK-PARROT.html